Paul Kay is an Australian former soccer player. Kay played 137 matches in the National Soccer League between 1978 and 1991 for Newcastle KB United, St. George, Wollongong City, Sydney City, Blacktown City, and Wollongong Macedonia. He also spent a stint in England for Charlton Athletic but was unable to break into the first team.

Playing career

Club career
Kay joined St George in 1978.

In late 1981, Kay headed to England to trial with Second Division team Charlton Athletic. After ten weeks with the club, he signed a two-year contract with a $10,000 transfer fee.

On his return to Australia, Kay signed for Sydney City, though his return was delayed by a dispute between his new club and his former club Wollongong Wolves over his contract status. Kay transferred from Sydney City to Blacktown City mid-way through the 1986 National Soccer League season with the fee reported to be $9,000.

International career
Kay made his debut for Australia at the 1980 Oceania Cup. He scored four times at the tournament, including two goals in the final, which Australia won 4–2 over Tahiti. Because of the nature of the opposition, only one match of the tournament counted as a full international match. He only played two further full international matches for Australia, the last being against Taiwan in September 1981.

Career statistics

References

1962 births
Living people
Australian expatriate sportspeople in England
Australian soccer players
Australia international soccer players
National Soccer League (Australia) players
Wollongong Wolves FC players
Association football midfielders
1980 Oceania Cup players
Wollongong United FC players
Blacktown City FC players